Petreasa is a Romanian placename, referring to several villages in Romania:

 Petreasa, a village in Horea Commune, Alba County
 Petreasa, a village in Remetea Commune, Bihor County

See also 
 Petre (disambiguation)
 Petreni (disambiguation)
 Petrești (disambiguation)